Daniele Pedrelli (born 16 May 1988) is an Italian footballer who plays as a defender or midfielder for Sansepolcro.

Career
Born in Fivizzano, Tuscany, Pedrelli started his career at hometown club Fivizzanese, then moved to FoCe Vara of the Province of La Spezia, Liguria, about 30 km away. He then played at Spezia. He was promoted from Allievi Nazionali under-17 Team to Berretti under-20 Team in 2005. Since Spazia promoted to Serie B in 2006, their Berretti team changed to play at Campionato Primavera. In January 2007, he joined Internazionale's Primavera Team on loan. He won the champion that season. In July 2007, he signed a 4-year professional contract with Inter. In exchange, Inter loaned a few players to the friendly club. Pedrelli has played a few friendlies with Inter first team in 2007–08 season.

After Inter bought some players from another friendly club Treviso in June 2008, Primavera under-20 team teammate Pedrelli (50% valued for €275,000) and Gianluca Litteri were sold to Treviso in co-ownership deal in July. He played 18 league matches for the Serie B struggler. In June 2009, few weeks before the bankrupt of Treviso, Inter bought back Pedrelli, and allowed Federico Piovaccari joined Treviso permanently.

In July 2009, he left for Serie B newcomer Cesena on loan with option to purchase. On 7 July 2010, he was loaned to newly promoted Prima Divisione side Spezia from Internazionale with option to purchase 50% registration rights. He was the second left back signed by Spezia that season, behind Juri Toppan who signed from Inter. However Pedrelli was the starting defender with 26 starts in 2010–11 Lega Pro Prima Divisione. Pedrelli was a backup in 2011–12 Lega Pro Prima Divisione season.

In June 2012 Inter gave up the remain registration rights by not submitting a bid.

On 30 July 2012 he left for Carrarese. In the summer of 2013 he moved to Virtus Entella. The following year he emigrated to Portugal where he will play for a season, in Olhanense. In the season 15-16 plays to Ancona.
On 5 July 2016, he joined Reggiana for free. 

On 12 July 2019, he signed a 1-year contract with Vis Pesaro. On 31 January 2020, he moved to Pianese.

Honours
Champion
 Supercoppa di Lega di Prima Divisione: 2012
 Lega Pro Prima Divisione: 2012
 Coppa Italia Lega Pro: 2012
Runner-up
Serie B: 2010

References

External links
 Profile at Cesena 
 Profile at AIC.Football.it 
 
 

1988 births
Footballers from Tuscany
Living people
Italian footballers
Association football fullbacks
Spezia Calcio players
Inter Milan players
Treviso F.B.C. 1993 players
A.C. Cesena players
Pisa S.C. players
S.C. Olhanense players
A.S. Gubbio 1910 players
Serie B players
Serie C players
Liga Portugal 2 players
Italian expatriate footballers
Italian expatriate sportspeople in Portugal
Expatriate footballers in Portugal
Sportspeople from the Province of Massa-Carrara